The TransJakarta Corridor 12 is the TransJakarta bus rapid transit route that serves from the Pluit BRT Station to the Tanjung Priok BRT Station. The roads that corridor 12 passes are along Jalan Pluit Putri/Putra, Jalan Pluit Timur, Jalan Pluit Selatan, Jalan Jembatan Tiga, Jalan Bandengan Selatan, Jalan Gedong Panjang, Jalan Kopi, Jalan Tiang Bendera 5, Jalan Roa Malaka Utara, Jalan Tiang Bendera, Jalan Kunir, Jalan Lada, Jalan Bank, Jalan Kali Besar Barat, Jalan Jembatan Batu, Jalan Mangga Dua, Jalan Gunung Sahari, Jalan Angkasa, Jalan HBR Motik, Jalan Danau Sunter Barat, Jalan Danau Sunter Utara, Jalan Mitra Sunter Boulevard, Jalan Danau Sunter Selatan Dalam, Jalan Yos Sudarso, and Jalan Enggano. This corridor is integrated with the Jakarta Kota Station at the Kota BRT Station, the Kampung Bandan Station at the ITC Mangga Dua BRT Station, and also the Tanjung Priuk railway station at the Tanjung Priok BRT Station which serves the KRL Commuterline. At one time, this corridor used articulated buses, but because the route was very winding, especially in the old city area where the streets were narrow, it was quite difficult to maneuver there, so the buses were changed to single buses. 

Corridor 12 was inaugurated on February 14, 2013, with 36 new bus fleet at the first day of the operational. On July 2015, this corridor was shortened, only limited from Penjaringan to Tanjung Priok, at that time the Pluit BRT Station had not served corridor 12. Then on August 2019, this corridor route was shortened again, so it only serves the Penjaringan - Sunter route. As of December 18 2021, corridor 12 has returned to its original route, Pluit - Tanjung Priok. For now, the Penjaringan - Sunter route is only used as the axis route.

List of BRT Stations 

 Stations indicated by a -> sign has a one way service towards Tanjung Priok only. Stations indicated by a <- sign has a one way service towards Pluit only.
 Currently, all bus stops are served by buses 24 hours a day.

Fleets 

 Mercedes-Benz OH 1626 NG A/T, white-blue (TJ)
 Mercedes-Benz OH 1526 NG, white-light blue (TJ)

Depots 

 Cakung (TJ)
 Pulogadung (TJ)
 Cijantung (MYS)

See also 

 TransJakarta
 List of TransJakarta corridors

References

External links 

 

TransJakarta